Sulfur mononitride is an inorganic compound with the molecular formula NS. It is the sulfur analogue of and isoelectronic to the radical nitric oxide, NO. It was initially detected in 1975, in outer space in giant molecular clouds and later the coma of comets. This spurred further laboratory studies of the compound. Synthetically, it is produced by electric discharge in mixtures of nitrogen and sulfur compounds, or combustion in the gas phase and by photolysis in solution.

Synthesis 
The NS radical is a highly transient species, with a lifetime on the order of milliseconds, but it can be observed spectroscopically over short periods of time through several methods of generation. NS is too reactive to isolate as a solid or liquid, and has only been prepared as a vapor in low pressure or low-temperature matrices due to its tendency to rapidly oligomerize to more stable, diamagnetic species.

Discharge of nitrogen and sulfur vapor 
Transmission of electric discharge through a glass tube with quartz windows containing a mixture of nitrogen and sulfur vapor (rigorously free of oxygen) results in the spectrum of emitted light gaining bands consistent with the formation of NS.

Passing a mixture of gaseous N2 and S2Cl2 through the side arm of an absorption cell undergoing microwave discharge produces NS. Infrared diode laser spectroscopy taken using this method allowed for derivation of the equilibrium rotational constant, and therefore calculation of the equilibrium bond length as 1.4940 Å.

With low pressure microwave discharge of elemental nitrogen and sulfur, followed by low temperature trapping in argon matrices, one obtains a mixture of products including NS, NNS, SNS, and NSS. By adding excess sulfur, SSNS is also produced.

Burning of sulfur and nitrogen doped flames 
Methane was premixed with fuel in the form of either O2, N2O, or air and burned at ambient pressure. The source of nitrogen was introduced by addition of 1-5 mole% NH3 gas and sulfur by 0.01-0.5 mol% H2S or SF6 gas. A steady state concentration of NS within the flame front is observed by laser-induced fluorescence (LIF) spectrum.

Flash laser photolysis of tetranitrogen tetrasulfide 
N4S4 (g) was obtained by the following reaction:

Removal of byproducts leaves only N4S4 in toluene, which is through a gas inlet pipe into the reaction cell.

Another common method for bulk production of N4S4 production involves the condensation of ammonia with S2Cl2 in inert solvents, however the former method was chosen to avoid isolation of N4S4 in its reactive, solid state.

The NS radical was subsequently identified by LIF spectrum as the product of photolysis of N4S4 (g) by a 248 nm laser.

Flash and continuous photolysis of Cr(CH3CN)5(NS)2+ 
Aerated solutions of Cr(CH3CN)5(NS)2+ are highly photoactive and prone to rapid decomposition. Deaerated solutions of Cr(CH3CN)5(NS)2+ in acetonitrile are stable as long as they are kept in the dark. Continuous photolysis using 366 nm light is slow, while using a 355 nm pulsed laser results in faster labilization of NS.

Reactivity

Oligomerization 
Evidence suggests that NS can react with itself to reach N2S2, N4S4, and polymers of the form (NS)x. (NS)x forms from polymerization of cyclo-N2S2.

Trans-NSSN results from direct dimerization of NS.

N3S3 has been observed through photoelectron spectroscopy of vapors of the (SN)x, polymer, but has not yet been characterized further. Attempts to produce N3S3 by oxidation of [PPN][S3N3] were unsuccessful. Its theorized that rapid dimerization to (N3S3)2 will disproportionate irreversibly to N4S4 and N2S2.

Products of decay with NO2 
The radical decay time of NS alone is on the order of 1-3 ms. As evident by no change to this decay time upon addition of NO or O2 at ambient temperatures, the NS radical is unreactive with NO and O2. However, rapid, first-order decay is observed with the addition of NO2. This reaction is proposed to proceed through various intermediates, ultimately reaching final products of N2 and SO2.
This rapid reaction occurs with a rate constant of k = (2.54 ± 0.12) × 10−11 cm3 molecules−1 s−1 at 295 K. By use of Density Functional Theory based computational calculations, the minima and transition states of the potential energy surface of this reaction have been predicted.

Astronomical reactivity 
Within the inner coma of comets, many reactions are theorized to be relevant to the formation and reactivity of the NS radical.

Metal-thionitrosyl complexes 
As a ligand, NS acts as a σ-donor and π-acceptor, forming metal-thionitrosyl complexes. Transition-metal thionitrosyl complexes have been prepared by the following procedures:

 Sulfur transfer to metal nitrido complexes
 Example: Reflux of (Ph4P)[OsNCl4] and (Ph4P)NCS yields green-brown solid [Ph4P]2[Os(NS)(NCS)5] 
 Reaction of trithiazyltrichloride with transition metal complexes
 NSCl3 + OsCl3 > [Os(NS)Cl3] 
 Halide abstraction from coordinated thiazyl complexes
 Abstraction of sulfur-bonded fluorine from [(η5-C5H5)Cr(NO)2(NSF)]-[AsF6]  by AsF5 > [(η5-C5H5)Cr(NO)2(NS)]-[AsF6]2 
 Reaction of NS+ salts with transition metal complexes
 NS+SbF6- + [M(CO)5Br] > [M(CO)5(NS)]2+, M=Mn, Re 
 NS+AsF6- + [(η5-C5H5)Fe(CO)2(SO2)]+ > [(η5-C5H5)Fe(CO)2(NS)][AsF6]2 
 Reaction of tetrasulfur tetranitride with metal halides or nitrides

From X-ray crystallography of many of such metal-thionitrosyl complexes, one can observe that the M-N-S bond angle is nearly linear, suggesting sp hybridization about N. Short M-N distances and long N-S distances reflect the resonance structure of M=N=S having greater contribution than M-N≡S.

Typical v(NS) IR stretching frequencies are approximately 1065 cm−1 for low-valent transition metal complexes and around 1390 cm−1 in the high valent cases, whereas the free gas-phase radical exhibits a 1204 cm−1 signal.

Electronic structure of Fe(S2CNMe2)2(NS) 
The electronic structures of Fe(S2CNMe2)2(NE), where E=O, S, or Se were calculated using Density Functional Theory methods. It was found that the large Mulliken spin density remained concentrated on the Fe(NE) core and Fe-N distances experienced little change from the chalcogen atom used. The HOMO of both nitrosyl and thionitrosyl complexes retained 1a1 (dz2) character. The small changes in the energies of the spin orbitals of the complexes, particularly the decreased energetic gap between 2b2 and 1b1 and 2b1 and 1b1 orbitals is attributed to NS being a weaker π-acceptor than NO.

Photoinduced NS transfer from chromium to iron 
When a spin-trapping agent, such as Fe(S2CNEt2)2 is present during the photolysis of Cr(CH3CN)5(NS)2+, new S=1/2 EPR bands are observed, attributed to the formation of Fe(S2CNEt2)2(NS), and the signal from Cr(CH3CN)5(NS)2+ disappears. This suggests that the NS radical has transferred from the chromium complex to the iron complex.
This was particularly significant as it was the first controlled and well-characterized reactivity of NS in solution. Further, it showed the potential for similar reactivity in known reactions with NO, such as use of this iron dithiocarbamate complex.

Bonding 

The valence electrons of this compound match those of nitric oxide. Sulfur mononitride can be described as some average of a set of resonance structures. The singly bonded structure (first resonance structure shown) has little contribution. The formal bond order is considered to be 2.5.

Versus NO 
The decreasing electronegativity with increasingly heavy chalcogenides leads to a reversal of the dipole. In NO, oxygen is the more electronegative element. In NS, nitrogen is more electronegative. The NS radical is significantly more unstable and prone to catenation than NO.

In Astronomy 
Molecules in distant astronomical regions can be identified based on their unique rotational transitions, of which the corresponding microwave frequencies are detectable by antennae on Earth. The presence of interstellar sulfur mononitride was first reported in 1975 by back to back letters published in the Astrophysical Journal.

Interstellar NS was first identified in the giant molecular cloud Sagittarius B2 (Sgr B2). Its presence was reported in two concurrent articles. Measurements conducted with the National Radia Astronomy Observatory telescope at Kitt Peak, Arizona, picked up millimeter-wavelength radiation in Sgr B2 attributed to c-state transitions of NS in the 2Π1/2 state from J=5/2 to J=3/2 at 115.16 GHz. This assignment was confirmed by measurements conducted at University of Texas Millimeter Wave Observatory on Mount Locke as well, demonstrating J=5/2 to J=3/2 c-state and d-state transitions at 115.16 GHz and 115.6 GHz, respectively. Hyperfine interactions arise from 14N magnetic and electric-quadrupole moments.

NS has been detected in regions responsible for forming massive stars, such as giant molecular clouds like Sg B2 and cold, dark clouds such as L134N and TMC-1. One survey found NS in 12 out of 14 GMC studied, additionally observing the J=7/2 to J=5/2 and J=3/2 to J=1/2 transitions at 161 and 69 GHz, respectively. The abundance of NS in these regions was approximated based on the ratio of observed to intrinsic hyperfine line strengths as well as modeling using a statistical equilibrium program, finding low abundance in all except the Orion molecular cloud.

NS was also observed in the coma of the comets Hyakutake and Hale-Bopp. It's believed that the observed abundance is higher than gas-phase, ion-molecule models due to an unidentified species X-NS photo-dissociating to release NS.

Industrial Applications 
Detection of NS at steady state concentration in the reaction zone of the combustion of methane doped with ammonia and a fuel sulfur such as H2S suggests that NS may be an important reactive intermediate in burning of hydrocarbon flames in a reducing atmosphere, which is relevant to coal pyrolysis and combustion.

Fossil fuels contain bound nitrogen, which releases elevated levels of nitric oxide emissions during combustion. NOx emissions can be controlled by denitrification of the fuel source, combustion chamber modification, or both. One developing technique is the reburning of NOx, which is reduced to N2. These fuels also contain variable amounts of sulfur, which is oxidized to SO2. Therefore, understanding the reactivity of NO and SO2 is crucial to the process of reburning. The experimental apparatus to test this involved a primary flame for producing combustion products, which were mixed with NO and SO2 to mimic coal burning byproducts. This mixture was fed into the burner at atmospheric pressure. 1-2% decrease in NOx concentration is observed at various percentages of total fuel inlet (reburn ratio) in the presence of 0.1% SO2, which is attributed to the formation of H2S, HS, and the resulting reaction with NO, giving rise to NS. Reaction: HS + NO > NS + OH.

Related compounds
Trithiazyl trichloride

See also
 Sulfur nitride

References

Free radicals
Inorganic compounds
Nitrides
Sulfur–nitrogen compounds
Diatomic molecules